Alexandre de Gusmão (Santos, 17 July 1695 – Lisbon, 9 May 1753) was a diplomat born in the Portuguese colony of Brazil. He is regarded as one of the best diplomats of his time, chiefly for his role in negotiating the Treaty of Madrid in 1750 (revoked in 1761), when Portugal and Spain were attempting to delimit their territorial possessions in South America and Asia. Born in the city of Santos, he may be considered one of the precursors of the application of the principles of Illuminism to international relations, adopting the principle of uti possidetis, according to which each state has the right to the land that it actually occupies, as well as the idea of "natural boundaries", which suggests the use of prominent geographical accidents – such as rivers and mountain ranges – to set the limits between states. He graduated in Law and was the representative of Portugal to various states, among which Rome, where he came to be invited to join Pope Innocent XIII's court. He was also a brother of Bartolomeu de Gusmão, a priest and naturalist recalled for his early work on lighter-than-air airship design (balloons).

Treaty of Madrid negotiations

During the period of the Iberian Union (1580–1640), due to the Portuguese dynastic succession crisis, Portugal and all its territorial possessions in Africa, Asia and the Americas came under the control of the Philippine Dynasty, of Spain. Because both countries had come under the same rule, there ceased to be boundaries between their territories in their colonies, which had been established by the Treaty of Tordesillas (1494) in America and the Treaty of Zaragoza (1529) in Asia. Hence, the colonial explorers (bandeirantes) from the Portuguese colony of Brazil expanded westwards into the centre of the continent, occupying what was once Spanish and Amerindian territory. In Asia, on the other hand, Spanish explorers expanded to occupy territory which had been attributed to Portugal under the Treaty of Zaragoza.

When the union of the two crowns ended, in 1640, there was the need to renegotiate the boundaries of both territories, and Portugal's interest was to preserve its new possessions in America, while Spain wished to return to the limits defined by the Treaty of Tordesillas and the Treaty of Zaragoza, which had never been officially revoked.

By means of studies submitted to the Spanish Court, Gusmão proved that while Portugal had breached the Tordesillas Line, with the Portuguese occupying part of the Amazon basin and the Center-West of South America, Spain had breached the Zaragoza Line by expanding its possessions in Asia, taking the Philippines, the Marianas and the Moluccas, which were once Portuguese. Alexandre de Gusmão successfully argued that the losses of one kingdom in one region had been compensated by its gains in another, and that the principle for territorial division should be the effective occupation of the land (uti possidetis). Through ample documentation and efficient negotiation, he thus managed to secure for Portugal (and, after independence, for Brazil) most of the current Brazilian territory.

Places where he lived
1695–1708: Santos, Brazil
1708:  Bahia, Brazil
1709–1714: Coimbra, Portugal
1714–1719: Paris, France
1719–1723: Lisbon, Portugal
1723–1730: Rome, Italy
1730–1753: Lisbon, Portugal

Education
1708: Santos and Bahia — Preparatory studies
1715–1719: Paris — Studies of Civil Law, Roman Law and Ecclesiastic Law at the Sorbonne
1719: Coimbra  — Bachelor's degree at the School of Law

Bachelor's degree in law
In 1710, Alexandre de Gusmão moved to Lisbon to live with his brother Bartolomeu de Gusmão. Through contacts in the Portuguese Court, he was appointed secretary to the Portuguese Embassy in Paris, in 1715, where he studied law at the Sorbonne.

Diplomatic posts
1714–1730: Paris and Rome — Agent of the House of Portugal.
1715: Paris  — Takes part in the negotiations of the peace Treaty of Utrecht, between Portugal and Spain.
1730–1750: Lisbon — Counsellor and personal secretary of king Dom João V.
1743–1753: Lisbon — Member of the Ultramarine Council.
1750: Lisbon — Formulator of the Portuguese position and negotiator of the Treaty of Madrid.

External links (in Portuguese)
Fundação Alexandre de Gusmão
Personalidades e Diplomatas Históricos
Resumo da biografia de Alexandre de Gusmão
Almanaque Folha - História de SP

1695 births
1753 deaths
University of Paris alumni
People from Santos, São Paulo
Brazilian diplomats
Portuguese diplomats